Wizard of the Saddle is a 1928 American silent Western film directed by Frank Howard Clark and starring Buzz Barton, Milburn Morante and James Ford.

Cast
 Buzz Barton as Red Hepner 
 Milburn Morante as Hank Robbins 
 James Ford as Tom Ellis 
 Duane Thompson as Jenny Adams 
 Jim Welch as 'Pop' Adams
 Bert Appling as Kirk McGrew

References

Bibliography
 Munden, Kenneth White. The American Film Institute Catalog of Motion Pictures Produced in the United States, Part 1. University of California Press, 1997.

External links
 

1928 films
1928 Western (genre) films
1920s English-language films
American black-and-white films
Film Booking Offices of America films
Silent American Western (genre) films
1920s American films